Kemal is a Turkish masculine given name which means fullness, perfection, maturity; corresponding to the Arabic Kamal and may refer to:

Given name

First name
 Kemal Akbaba (born 1988), Turkish football player
 Kemal Alispahić (born 1969), Bosnian footballer
 Kemal Alomerović (born 1980), Macedonian football player
 Kemal Arıkan (1927–1982), Turkish diplomat assassinated by an Armenian group in Los Angeles, CA, United States
 Kemal Aslan (born 1981), Turkish football player
 Kemal Başar (born 1963), Turkish theatre director
 Kemal Bokhary (born 1947), judge in Hong Kong
 Kemal Bourhani (born 1981), French footballer of Comorian descent
 Kemal Curić (born 1978), Bosnian automobile designer
 Kemal Derviş (born 1949), Turkish economist and politician
 Kemal Dinçer (born 1963), Turkish basketball player
 Kemal Faruki (1906–1988), Turkish footballer
 Kemal Gekić (born 1962), American classical pianist of Bosnian ancestry
 Kemal Güleş (born 1999), Turkish amputee footballer
 Kemal Arda Gürdal (born 1990), Turkish swimmer
 Kemal Idris (1923–2010), Indonesian Army general
 Kemal Izzet (born 1980), English footballer of Turkish Cypriot ethnicity
 Kemal Karpat (1924–2019), Turkish historian
 Kemal Kaya Effendi, Turkish military officer
 Kemal Kayhan (born 1983), Turkish volleyball player
 Kemal Kerinçsiz (born 1960), Turkish lawyer and political activist
 Kemal Kıvanç Elgaz (born 1986), Turkish volleyball player
 Kemal Kılıçdaroğlu (born 1948), Turkish politician
 Kemal Kirişci, Turkish academic and political scientist
 Kemal Koyuncu (born 1985), Turkish athlete
 Kemal Kozarić (born 1956), Bosnian banker
 Kemal Küçükbay (born 1982), Turkish cyclist
 Kemal Kurspahić (1946–2021), Bosnian journalist
 Kemal Kurt (1947–2002), German author and translator of Turkish descent
 Kemal Malovčić (born 1946), Bosnian singer
 Kemal Monteno (1948–2015), Bosnian singer
 Kemal Okyay (born 1985), Turkish footballer
 Kemal Reis (1451–1511), Turkish privateer and admiral
 Kemal Satır (1911–1991), Turkish physician and politician
 Kemal Sunal (1944–2000), Turkish actor
 Kemal Şahin (born 1955), Turkish entrepreneur
 Kemal Tahir (1910–1973), Turkish author and intellectual
 Kemal Tokak (born 1989), Turkish footballer
 Kemal Türkler (1926–1980), Turkish labor union leader
 Kemal Unakıtan (1946–2016), Turkish politician
 Kemal Zeytinoğlu (1911–1959), Turkish engineer and politician

Middle name
 Ali Kemal Bey (1867–1922), Turkish journalist and politician
 Derviş Kemal Deniz (born 1954), Turkish Cypriot minister of economy and tourism
 Mehmet Kemal Ağar (born 1951), Turkish politician
 Mustafa Kemal Atatürk (1881–1938), the founder and first President of Turkey
 Mustafa Kemal Kurdas (1920–2011), Turkish economist and politician 
 Namık Kemal Yolga (1914–2001), Turkish diplomat
 Namık Kemal Zeybek (born 1944), Turkish politician
 Orhan Kemal Cengiz, Turkish lawyer, journalist and human rights activist
 Yahya Kemal Beyatlı (1884–1958), Turkish writer

Surname
 György Ekrem-Kemál (1946–2009), Hungarian nationalist politician
 Mariz Kemal (born 1950), Russian poet
 Namık Kemal (1840–1888), Turkish writer
 Yaşar Kemal (1923–2015), Turkish writer

Pseudonym
 Orhan Kemal (1914–1970), Turkish writer

References

Bosniak masculine given names
Turkish-language surnames
Turkish masculine given names